John Dickson Batten (8 October 1860 – 5 August 1932), born in Plymouth, Devon, was an English painter of figures in oils, tempera and fresco and a book illustrator and printmaker. He was an active member of the Society of Painters in Tempera, with his wife Mary Batten, a gilder.

Career
As a student at the Slade School of Fine Arts under Alphonse Legros he exhibited until 1887 at the Grosvenor Gallery with Sir Edward Burne-Jones. He indulged in mythological and allegorical themes.
Among Batten's paintings are The Garden of Adonis: Amoretta and Time, The Family, Mother and Child, Sleeping Beauty: The Princess Pricks Her Finger, Snow White and the Seven Dwarves, and Atalanta and Melanion.

In the 1890s Batten illustrated a series of fairy tale collections edited by Joseph Jacobs, who was a member of the Folklore Society (and editor of its journal 1890–93): at least English Fairy Tales, Celtic Fairy Tales, Indian Fairy Tales, More English Fairy Tales, and More Celtic Fairy Tales from 1890 to 1895  and Europa's Fairy Book (1916). (The latter has also been issued as European Folk and Fairy Tales.) He also illustrated English versions of Tales from the Arabian Nights and Dante's Inferno.

Batten also wrote two books of poetry and a book on animal and human flight.

At the end of the 1890s he turned to the painting technique of egg tempera and played an important part in its revival with Birmingham artists such as Arthur Gaskin. His Pandora in this medium was exhibited at the Royal Academy in 1913 and presented to Reading University in 1918, where it has now been restored. Batten also served as a Secretary to the Society of Painters in Tempera and published in 1922 an article on The Practice of Tempera Painting.

Gallery

References

Sources
Alan Windsor. (1998) Handbook of Modern British Painting and Printmaking, 1900–1990. Ashgate Publishing, 2nd ed.  .

External links

 
 
 
  

1860 births
1932 deaths
19th-century English painters
English male painters
20th-century English painters
English illustrators
English children's book illustrators
19th-century illustrators of fairy tales
20th-century illustrators of fairy tales
Artists from Plymouth, Devon
20th-century English male artists
19th-century English male artists